Donbass is a 2018 internationally co-produced black comedy war film directed by Sergei Loznitsa. It was selected as the opening film in the Un Certain Regard section at the 2018 Cannes Film Festival. At Cannes, Loznitsa won the Un Certain Regard award for Best Director, as well as the Silver Pyramid at the 40th Cairo International Film Festival. It was selected as the Ukrainian entry for the Best Foreign Language Film at the 91st Academy Awards, but it was not nominated. It was filmed in Kryvyi Rih, 300 km west of Donetsk. At the 49th International Film Festival of India it received the Main Prize - Golden Peacock for Best Feature Film.

Plot

The film's thirteen segments explore the mid-2010s conflict between Ukraine and the Russian-supported Donetsk People's Republic in the Donbas region of Ukraine.

Reception

Critical response
Donbass has an approval rating of 88% on review aggregator website Rotten Tomatoes, based on 58 reviews, and an average rating of 7.3/10. The website's critical consensus states, “Brutally powerful and brilliantly filmed, Donbass illustrates man's inhumanity with visceral effectiveness.” It also has a score of 78 out of 100 on Metacritic, based on 17 critics, indicating “generally favorable reviews”.

Awards
Loznitsa won the Un Certain Regard award for Best Director at the 2018 Cannes Film Festival. He also won the Silver Pyramid, also known as the Special Jury Prize for Best Director, at the 40th Cairo International Film Festival, tied with Thai director Phuttiphong Aroonpheng for Manta Ray. It won Golden Peacock (Best Film) at the 49th International Film Festival of India.

See also
 List of submissions to the 91st Academy Awards for Best Foreign Language Film
 List of Ukrainian submissions for the Academy Award for Best Foreign Language Film

References

External links
 
 
 
 

2018 films
2018 black comedy films
Ukrainian comedy-drama films
Ukrainian-language films
Films directed by Sergei Loznitsa
Donbas culture
War in Donbas films